End is an American hardcore punk group composed of singer Brendan Murphy, guitarists Will Putney and Gregory Thomas, bassist Jay Pepito, and drummer Billy Rymer.

History

The band was formed in 2017 and in August of that year released the song "Usurper", as a single from their debut EP, "From the Unforgiving Arms of God", which was released on September 8, 2017. In early 2020, drummer Andrew McEnaney left and was replaced by Billy Rymer

On March 26, 2020, the band released the single "Pariah", and announced their debut album "Splinters from an Ever-Changing Face" would be released through Closed Casket Activities. They released 3 more singles from the album, and on June 5, 2020, released their debut album, "Splinters from an Ever-Changing Face". Forbes noted that the band seemed like the next powerhouse within hardcore music.

Members
Current
 Brendan Murphy – lead vocals (2017–present)
 Will Putney – guitar (2017–present)
 Gregory Thomas – guitar (2017–present)
 Jay Pepito – bass guitar (2017–present)
 Billy Rymer – drums (2020–present)

Past
 Andrew McEnaney – drums (2017-2020)

Touring
 Matt Guglielmo – drums (2017–present)

Discography
Albums
 Splinters from an Ever-Changing Face (2020)

EPs
 From the Unforgiving Arms of God (2017)
 Gather & Mourn (split with Cult Leader) (2022)

References

Musical groups established in 2017
American grindcore musical groups
Hardcore punk groups from New Jersey
Metalcore musical groups from New Jersey
2017 establishments in New Jersey